is a Japanese football player. She plays for JEF United Chiba. She formerly played for the Japan national team.

Club career
Yamane was born in Hiroshima on December 20, 1990. After graduating from JFA Academy Fukushima, she joined TEPCO Mareeze based in Fukushima Prefecture club in 2009. However, the club was disbanded for Fukushima Daiichi nuclear disaster in 2011. She moved to JEF United Chiba in 2012. She left the club in July 2017. In August, she joined Spanish Primera División club Real Betis. She played for the club in 2 seasons. In August 2019, she returned to JEF United Chiba.

National team career
In November 2008, Yamane was selected Japan U-20 national team for 2008 U-20 World Cup. On January 15, 2010, she debuted for Japan national team against Chile. In July, she was selected Japan U-20 team for 2010 U-20 World Cup. In 2014, she was a member for 2014 Asian Cup and 2014 Asian Games. Japan won the championship at Asian Cup and 2nd place at Asian Games. In 2015, she also played at 2015 World Cup and Japan won 2nd place. She played 23 games for Japan until 2017.

National team statistics

References

External links

Japan Football Association
  選手インタビュー (Player interview) at Japan Football Association

1990 births
Living people
Association football people from Hiroshima Prefecture
Sportspeople from Hiroshima
Japanese women's footballers
Japan women's international footballers
Japanese expatriates in Spain
Expatriate women's footballers in Spain
Nadeshiko League players
TEPCO Mareeze players
JEF United Chiba Ladies players
Real Betis Féminas players
2015 FIFA Women's World Cup players
Asian Games medalists in football
Asian Games silver medalists for Japan
Footballers at the 2014 Asian Games
Footballers at the 2012 Summer Olympics
Women's association football goalkeepers
Medalists at the 2014 Asian Games
Olympic footballers of Japan